Guillaume Tell is the French name for Swiss folk hero William Tell. The name can also refer to:

 Guillaume Tell (Grétry), a French comic opera of the 18th century
 Guillaume Tell (athlete), a French Olympian of the 1920s
 Guillaume Tell (1795), a French warship of the Revolutionary period
 Guillaume Tell et le Clown ("The Adventures of William Tell"), a French short film of 1898 featuring trick photography

See also
 William Tell (disambiguation)